The 1976–77 NBA season was the 28th season for the Philadelphia 76ers franchise in the NBA. Just months earlier, the American Basketball Association had ended its ninth and final campaign and the two leagues combined. In a special $6 million deal, the Nets sold Julius Erving, the ABA's leading scorer, to the Philadelphia 76ers for $3 million. The other $3 million went to Erving, by way of a new contract. In Philadelphia, Erving joined another scoring machine, George McGinnis, who had come over earlier from the Indiana Pacers. This accumulation of talent brought talk of an immediate championship to Philadelphia.

The talented 76ers had posted the best record in the Eastern Conference with a record of 50–32. Gene Shue was the coach & his key players were Erving (the esteemed Dr. J), McGinnis & 6-foot-6 shooting guard Doug Collins. Other key contributors included point guard Henry Bibby and World B. Free. Caldwell Jones started at center with 20-year-old Darryl Dawkins, also known as "Chocolate Thunder," in a backup role. The reserve forwards were Steve Mix, Harvey Catchings and Joe Bryant. The Sixers beat the Boston Celtics & the Houston Rockets in the Eastern Conference Playoffs, but lost to the Portland Trail Blazers 4–2, after winning the first 2 games.

Offseason

NBA Draft

Roster

Regular season

Season standings

Record vs. opponents

Season schedule

October

Playoffs

|- align="center" bgcolor="#ffcccc"
| 1
| April 17
| Boston
| L 111–113
| Julius Erving (36)
| Caldwell Jones (11)
| Collins, Erving (5)
| Spectrum13,821
| 0–1
|- align="center" bgcolor="#ccffcc"
| 2
| April 20
| Boston
| W 113–101
| Julius Erving (30)
| George McGinnis (13)
| Doug Collins (7)
| Spectrum18,276
| 1–1
|- align="center" bgcolor="#ccffcc"
| 3
| April 22
| @ Boston
| W 109–100
| Julius Erving (27)
| McGinnis, Jones (15)
| George McGinnis (5)
| Boston Garden15,040
| 2–1
|- align="center" bgcolor="#ffcccc"
| 4
| April 24
| @ Boston
| L 119–124
| Doug Collins (36)
| George McGinnis (9)
| Doug Collins (5)
| Boston Garden15,040
| 2–2
|- align="center" bgcolor="#ccffcc"
| 5
| April 27
| Boston
| W 110–91
| Doug Collins (23)
| McGinnis, Jones (11)
| Doug Collins (6)
| Spectrum18,276
| 3–2
|- align="center" bgcolor="#ffcccc"
| 6
| April 29
| @ Boston
| L 108–113
| Doug Collins (32)
| George McGinnis (14)
| George McGinnis (5)
| Boston Garden15,040
| 3–3
|- align="center" bgcolor="#ccffcc"
| 7
| May 1
| Boston
| W 83–77
| World B. Free (27)
| George McGinnis (12)
| McGinnis, Mix (4)
| Spectrum18,276
| 4–3
|-

|- align="center" bgcolor="#ccffcc"
| 1
| May 5
| Houston
| W 128–117
| Julius Erving (24)
| George McGinnis (13)
| Doug Collins (8)
| Spectrum17,507
| 1–0
|- align="center" bgcolor="#ccffcc"
| 2
| May 8
| Houston
| W 106–97
| George McGinnis (21)
| George McGinnis (8)
| Julius Erving (10)
| Spectrum14,855
| 2–0
|- align="center" bgcolor="#ffcccc"
| 3
| May 11
| @ Houston
| L 94–118
| Julius Erving (28)
| George McGinnis (9)
| Doug Collins (7)
| The Summit15,676
| 2–1
|- align="center" bgcolor="#ccffcc"
| 4
| May 13
| @ Houston
| W 107–95
| Doug Collins (36)
| Caldwell Jones (11)
| George McGinnis (9)
| The Summit15,676
| 3–1
|- align="center" bgcolor="#ffcccc"
| 5
| May 15
| Houston
| L 115–118
| Julius Erving (37)
| George McGinnis (14)
| Henry Bibby (8)
| Spectrum18,276
| 3–2
|- align="center" bgcolor="#ccffcc"
| 6
| May 17
| @ Houston
| W 112–109
| Julius Erving (34)
| Julius Erving (9)
| Julius Erving (6)
| The Summit15,676
| 4–2
|-

|- align="center" bgcolor="#ccffcc"
| 1
| May 22
| Portland
| W 107–101
| Julius Erving (33)
| Caldwell Jones (11)
| Doug Collins (6)
| Spectrum18,276
| 1–0
|- align="center" bgcolor="#ccffcc"
| 2
| May 26
| Portland
| W 107–89
| Doug Collins (27)
| Caldwell Jones (14)
| Henry Bibby (11)
| Spectrum18,276
| 2–0
|- align="center" bgcolor="#ffcccc"
| 3
| May 29
| @ Portland
| L 107–129
| Julius Erving (28)
| George McGinnis (12)
| Julius Erving (5)
| Memorial Coliseum12,923
| 2–1
|- align="center" bgcolor="#ffcccc"
| 4
| May 31
| @ Portland
| L 98–130
| Julius Erving (24)
| Darryl Dawkins (11)
| Steve Mix (4)
| Memorial Coliseum12,913
| 2–2
|- align="center" bgcolor="#ffcccc"
| 5
| June 3
| Portland
| L 104–110
| Julius Erving (37)
| Caldwell Jones (13)
| Julius Erving (7)
| Spectrum18,276
| 2–3
|- align="center" bgcolor="#ffcccc"
| 6
| June 5
| @ Portland
| L 107–109
| Julius Erving (40)
| George McGinnis (16)
| Julius Erving (8)
| Memorial Coliseum12,951
| 2–4
|-

Awards and honors
Julius Erving, NBA All-Star Game Most Valuable Player Award
George McGinnis, All-NBA Second Team
Julius Erving, All-NBA Second Team

Milestones

References

76ers on Basketball Reference

Philadelphia
Philadelphia 76ers seasons
Eastern Conference (NBA) championship seasons
Philadel
Philadel